Cloudburst is a 2011 Canadian-American comedy-drama film written and directed by Thom Fitzgerald and starring Olympia Dukakis and Brenda Fricker. The film is an adaptation of Fitzgerald's 2010 play of the same name.
Cloudburst premiered at the Atlantic Film Festival in Halifax, Nova Scotia on September 16, 2011. It opened in a limited release in Canada on December 7, 2012.

Plot
Stella and Dotty are an older lesbian couple from Maine who embark on a Thelma and Louise-style road trip to Nova Scotia to get married after Dotty is moved into a nursing home by her granddaughter. Along the way they pick up Prentice, a hitchhiker travelling home to Nova Scotia to visit his dying mother, and the three bond as they travel together.

Cast
 Olympia Dukakis as Stella
 Brenda Fricker as Dot
 Ryan Doucette as Prentice
 Kristin Booth as Molly
 Michael McPhee as Tommy
 Mary-Colin Chisholm as Ynez
 Marlane O'Brien as Cat

Production
Fitzgerald adapted his own stage play for the screen. The film version was produced by Doug Pettigrew and Fitzgerald, and executive produced by Sidney Kimmel, Vicki McCarty, William Jarblum, Trudy Pettigrew, Dana Warren and Shandi Mitchell.  Fitzgerald had originally planned for the role of Dotty to be played by Joan Orenstein, but as she died while he was writing it, he cast Fricker instead. In press for the film, Fricker praised the screenplay, "I was so moved by it. The love story was so beautiful I couldn't say no to it." Three members of the original stage cast reprised their roles: Ryan Doucette, Marlane O'Brien, and Michael McPhee.

Critical reception
The film received an approval rating of 100% on review aggregator Rotten Tomatoes, with an average rating of 6.7/10, based on 9 reviews. The film debuted to an enthusiastic standing ovation on September 16, 2011 at the Atlantic Film Festival, where it won an Atlantic Canada Award for Best Screenplay and the People's Choice Audience Award for Best Film of the Festival. Its second festival appearance was October 20, 2011 at Cinéfest Sudbury International Film Festival, where it also won the Audience Choice Award for Best Film, and on October 23, 2011 the film was the opening night selection of the Edmonton International Film Festival where it won the Audience Award for Best Canadian Film. Cloudburst was very well received at film festivals from coast to coast in Canada, winning awards at festivals in Halifax, Montreal, Kingston, Edmonton, Victoria, and others.

Cloudburst made its U.S. debut at the Palm Springs International Film Festival where it was named a Best of the Fest. The film made its Australian debut at the Breath of Fresh Air Tasmania Film Festival. It made its European debut as Opening Night Gala of the Dublin International Film Festival. It was also selected as Opening Night Gala of the British Film Institute London Lesbian and Gay Film Festival and as the closing-night film of Frameline 36.

Brenda Fricker commented in 2012, "Of all the films I've made, only three do I remember where I felt I'd moved forward as an actress: Cloudburst, My Left Foot and The Field."

Accolades
 Asheville QFest Best Actress Award, Olympia Dukakis
 Asheville QFest Best Supporting Actress Award, Brenda Fricker
 Athens, Greece Outview Film Festival Best Film Award
 Atlanta Film Festival Pink Peach Feature Grand Jury Prize
 Atlanta Out on Film Festival Audience Award for Best Overall Feature 
 Atlanta Out on Film Jury Award for Best Film
 Atlanta Out on Film Jury Award for Best Actress, Olympia Dukakis
 Atlantic Film Festival People's Choice Audience Award for Best Film of the Festival
 Atlantic Film Festival Michael Weir Atlantic Canada Award for Best Screenplay, Thom Fitzgerald
 Barcelona International Gay & Lesbian Film Festival Audience Award for Best Film 
 Birmingham UK Shout Festival Audience Award for Best Picture
 British Film Institute London Lesbian and Gay Film Festival Opening Night Gala
Canadian Film Festival Opening Night Gala
 Cinefest Sudbury International Film Festival Audience Choice Award for Best Film of the Festival
 CNKY Cincinnati Kentucky GLBT Festival Award for Best Feature Film
 Copenhagen MIX Copenhagen Film Festival Audience Award for Best Film
 Edmonton International Film Festival Opening Night Gala
 Dublin International Film Festival Opening Night Gala
 Edmonton International Film Festival Audience Award for Best Canadian Indie Film
 Hannover Queer Film Festival Audience Award for Best Film
 Image+Nation Montreal GLBT Film Festival Best Feature Film Award
 Indianapolis LGBT Film Festival Audience Award for Best Lesbian Film 
 Kingston Reelout Film Festival Opening Night Gala
 Kingston Reelout Film Festival Audience Award for Best Narrative Feature
 Melbourne Queer Film Festival Opening Night Gala
Mix Milan Film Festival, Grand Jury Award for Best Feature
 New Zealand Out Takes: A Reel Queer Film Festival, Audience Award for Best Feature 
 North Carolina Gay and Lesbian Film Festival Audience Award for Best Feature
 Palm Springs International Film Festival Best of the Fest Selection
 Qfest Philadelphia Audience Award for Best Feature
 QFest St. Louis Audience Award for Best Feature
 Rainbow Reels Waterloo Film Festival People's Choice Award for Best Feature Film
 Sacramento Gay & Lesbian Film Festival Audience Award for Best Film
 San Diego FilmOut, Audience Award for Best Feature Film 
 San Diego FilmOut, Jury Award for Best Feature Film 
 San Diego FilmOut, Jury Award for Best Leading Actress 
 San Diego FilmOut, Jury Award for Best Direction 
 San Francisco Frameline Festival Audience Award for Best Film
 Southwest Gay and Lesbian Film Festival Audience Award for Best Feature
 Vancouver International Film Festival Top Ten Most Popular Canadian Film Award
 Victoria Film Festival Best Canadian Film Award

Adaptation
Cloudburst is based on the stage play by Thom Fitzgerald, which debuted on April 8, 2010 at the Plutonium Playhouse in Halifax, Nova Scotia. The play starred Carroll Godsman, Deborah Allen, Ryan Doucette, Marlane O'Brien, Michael McPhee and Amy Reitsma. The successful engagement ran for five weeks and closed on May 8, 2010. The production was nominated for several Merritt Awards, Nova Scotia's professional theatre awards, including nominations for Outstanding Production, Outstanding New Play (Fitzgerald) Outstanding Lead Actress (Allen), Outstanding Supporting Actor (Doucette),  and Outstanding Set Design (Fitzgerald). Fitzgerald won the Merritt Award for Outstanding New Play.

References

External links
  (Archive)
 
 
  Cloudburst at Northernstars (Canadian Movie Database)

2011 films
2011 independent films
2011 LGBT-related films
2010s adventure comedy-drama films
2010s road comedy-drama films
American adventure comedy-drama films
American independent films
American LGBT-related films
American road comedy-drama films
Canadian independent films
English-language Canadian films
Canadian LGBT-related films
Canadian road comedy-drama films
Lesbian-related films
LGBT and ageing
LGBT-related comedy-drama films
Same-sex marriage in film
Films about old age
Films set in Maine
Films set in Nova Scotia
Films shot in Nova Scotia
Films directed by Thom Fitzgerald
Sidney Kimmel Entertainment films
2010s English-language films
2010s American films
2010s Canadian films